Dudley Willis Rockwell was born June 20, 1913, in New Britain, Connecticut. Dud was the son of Ruth Gowdy Rockwell and Stanley Pickett Rockwell, inventor of the Rockwell hardness test. Dud graduated from Yale University Sheffield Scientific School in 1935 with a bachelor of science degree. He was a member of the Sheff School secret society, St. Elmo. In 1959, he was elected president of the Stanley P. Rockwell Co., a heat treating shop in Hartford, CT, a position he held until retiring in 1974.

He was chairman of the ASM Hartford Chapter in 1963-64, and president of the Metal Treating Institute in 1967-68. During his career as a metallurgist, Dud served on the ASM National Committee, was a popular lecturer, and authored numerous articles about heat treating.

Rockwell died October 1, 2006, peacefully at his home in Cushing, Maine.

References 

American metallurgists
Yale University alumni
1913 births
2006 deaths
People from New Britain, Connecticut
People from Cushing, Maine